Robert King (died 1558) was an English churchman who became the first Bishop of Oxford.

Biography
Robert King was a Cistercian monk, of Thame Park Abbey, and the last Abbot there, a position he obtained perhaps through the influence of the Bishop of Lincoln, John Longland, as whose prebendary and suffragan bishop he had acted from 1535: he was appointed suffragan bishop in Lincoln on 7 January 1527, and ordained and consecrated to the titular See of Rheon, Greece (Reonesis) on 13 May. This was a move from the position of abbot at Bruerne Abbey. Previously he had been vicar at Charlbury.

King became abbot at Oseney Abbey in 1537. Both Thame Park and Oseney were dissolved in 1539, as part of the Dissolution of the Monasteries under Henry VIII. In 1541 King was made Bishop of Thame and Oseney. The next year his diocese was changed, into the Diocese of Oxford. In further changes the cathedral in Oxford was the previous St Frideswide's Priory, and became instead part of Christ Church, Oxford. King is commemorated there by a window made by Bernard van Linge.

The buildings of the old Gloucester College, Oxford, which had become in 1542 the bishop's palace, were under Edward VI taken back by the Crown. King lived in what is now called the Old Palace (rebuilt in the seventeenth century), and Littlemore Hall.

Under Mary, he returned to Catholicism. He was a judge at the trial of Cranmer.

References

External links

Tudor Place – Robert King, Bishop of Oseney and Oxford
Oxford History – Bishops – Introduction

Year of birth missing
1558 deaths
English Cistercians
Bishops of Oxford
16th-century English bishops
16th-century English Roman Catholic bishops
Burials at Christ Church Cathedral, Oxford